Yermarus Thermal Power Station is a coal-based thermal power plant located in Yermarus  village in Raichur district, Karnataka. The power plant is owned by the Karnataka Power Corporation. This is India's first 800MW super critical thermal power plant and Bharat Heavy Electricals is the EPC contractor for this power project.

Capacity
The Installed capacity of the power plant in 1600 MW (2x800MW).

References

Coal-fired power stations in Karnataka
Buildings and structures in Raichur district
2015 establishments in Karnataka
Energy infrastructure completed in 2015